The Memorial Hall in Albert Square, Manchester, England, was constructed in 1863–1866 by Thomas Worthington. It was built to commemorate the bicentennial anniversary of the 1662 Act of Uniformity. One of the best examples of Venetian Gothic revival in the city, the hall is a Grade II* listed building.

History
The hall was built to commemorate the bicentennial anniversary of the 1662 Act of Uniformity, when the secession of some 2,000 Anglican clergy led to the birth of Nonconformism Surplus funds from the Albert Memorial were used to pay for the building. The architect was Thomas Worthington, who had a large and successful practice in Manchester. 

The hall provided a meeting place in the late 19th century for a host of Victorian societies, such as the Photographic, Statistical, Horticultural, Elocutionists and Positivists Societies. Other groups which used the building included the Home Missionary Board, Sir Charles Hallé’s choir and the Manchester Unitarian Sunday School Union. The ground floor and basement were let to provide an income for the maintenance of the hall.

After a period of disuse and dereliction in the early 21st century, the hall was renovated c.2012 and now houses a bar, restaurant and hotel.

Architecture
The Memorial Hall is one of the best examples in Manchester of the Venetian Gothic revival style, inspired by such buildings as the Ca' d'Oro, with fine stone tracery on all windows and a palatial exterior. Worthington designed the building after his second tour of Italy in 1858. The detailing is fine and "the subtlety of the polychromy (was) achieved by careful choice of materials". The hall is a Grade II* listed building as of 14 February 1972.

See also

Grade II* listed buildings in Greater Manchester
Listed buildings in Manchester-M2
Congregational Memorial Hall — the Memorial Hall in London

Notes

References

External links
 Article on the Memorial Hall by Dr Peter Lindfield, FSA

Grade II* listed buildings in Manchester
Gothic Revival architecture in Greater Manchester
Venetian Gothic architecture in the United Kingdom